Ann Progulske-Fox is an American dentist. She is a Distinguished Professor of Oral Biology at University of Florida College of Dentistry and a Fellow of the American Association for the Advancement of Science and National Academy of Inventors. Her research focuses on the molecular mechanisms of pathogenesis of Porphyromonas gingivalis.

Early life and education
Progulske-Fox was born to parents Donald Robert Progulske and Eunice Miller Progulske, alongside three siblings. She earned her Bachelor of Science degree from South Dakota State University and attended the University of Massachusetts Amherst for her PhD. Following this, she enrolled at the University of Connecticut Health Center for her post-doctoral fellowship.

Career
Upon receiving her PhD, Progulske-Fox accepted an assistant professor position at the University of Florida College of Dentistry in 1984.

References

Year of birth missing (living people)
Living people
University of Florida faculty
American dentists
University of Massachusetts Amherst alumni
University of Connecticut alumni
South Dakota State University alumni
Fellows of the National Academy of Inventors
Fellows of the American Association for the Advancement of Science